Ghaleb Cachalia (born 12 November 1956) is a South African businessman and a Member of Parliament (MP) for the Democratic Alliance (DA). He is the son of anti-Apartheid activists Amina and Yusuf Cachalia, and a relative of former African National Congress (ANC) MP Ismail Cachalia.

Early life 
Cachalia was born in Johannesburg in 1956, and grew up in Vrededorp, Fordsburg, and in Nugget Street.

He attended the Waterford School in Swaziland, to avoid the apartheid education system. However, his schooling there was interrupted when the South African government threatened him with “passport issues” because of his parents' involvement in anti-Apartheid activism. He was sent abroad to stay with his uncle and aunt in Britain, where he was forced to remain for ten years.

While overseas, he completed his O Levels, received a scholarship to the United World College of the Atlantic in Wales, and then went on to study history at the University of London School of Oriental and African Studies. He campaigned in the Anti-Apartheid Movement. Upon completion of his studies, he returned to South Africa, and went to the University of the Witwatersrand to study law, a degree which he did not complete. While at the university, he joined the Black Students Society and became its vice-president.

Business 
Cachalia joined his father's business, which supplied school uniforms for black students, and completed an apprenticeship at a clothing manufacturing facility in Johannesburg, then opened such facilities in Malawi and Mozambique. In the late 1990s, Cachalia sold the businesses, which could not compete with clothing manufacturers from Asia in terms of price and supply. He retained only one retail outlet, whose shareholding he transferred to the company's employees; the business still runs in Johannesburg's central business district.

He then entered into management consultancy in Zurich, Switzerland, and in Johannesburg.

Politics 
Cachalia had been a lifelong supporter of the ANC. However, he had become increasingly disillusioned since the Arms Deal controversy, and now believes that the ANC cannot be saved from the "kleptocracy", corruption and self-interest that have come to characterise the party. This led him to turn to the DA, who he had "always valued" "as a loyal opposition". He joined the DA as an ordinary member in early 2016, and ran as the DA's mayoral candidate for Ekurhuleni in the 2016 municipal elections, on a platform of transparent and accountable government. He lost to the ANC's candidate by only 11 votes. 

In April 2017, Cachalia laid a criminal charge of incitement and intimidation against Ekurhuleni Mayor, Mzwandile Masina, for threatening white anti-Zuma protestors with violence, and requested that the Ekurhuleni Council Speaker, Patricia Khumalo, investigate the matter.

He was sworn in as a DA MP on 4 May 2017, and Philip de Lange took over the DA leadership in Ekurhuleni.

Positions 
Cachalia considers himself "a liberal with a small L". He supports freedom of expression, and has defended Helen Zille in that respect, whom he has characterised as well-intentioned. He considers the Economic Freedom Fighters "social fascists".

References 

Living people
1956 births
People educated at Atlantic College
21st-century South African businesspeople
21st-century South African politicians
Members of the National Assembly of South Africa
Democratic Alliance (South Africa) politicians
South African people of Indian descent
South African people of Gujarati descent
People from Gauteng
People from Johannesburg